Sir John Selby Clements, CBE (25 April 1910 – 6 April 1988) was a British actor and producer who worked in theatre, television and film.

Biography

Theatre career
Clements attended St Paul's School and St John's College, Cambridge. He made his first professional appearance on the stage in 1930, then worked with Nigel Playfair and afterwards spent a few years in Ben Greet's Shakespearean Company.

In 1935 Clements founded the Intimate Theatre, a combined repertory and try-out venue, at Palmers Green. He appeared in almost 200 plays and also presented a number of plays in the West End as actor-manager-producer.

Clements married the actress Kay Hammond and together they had a critical success with their West End revival of Noël Coward's play Private Lives in 1945. In 1952 they both appeared in Clements's own play The Happy Marriage, an adaptation of Jean Bernard-Luc's . Clements starred as Edward Moulton Barrett in the musical Robert and Elizabeth, a successful adaptation of The Barretts of Wimpole Street.

In December 1951 Clements directed Man and Superman in the West End, and played the role of John Tanner alongside Allan Cuthbertson.

Clements was the artistic director of the Chichester Festival Theatre from  1966 to 1973.

The actor John Standing is his stepson.

Film career

As a film actor John Clements played bit parts of increasing size for Alexander Korda's London Films in the 1930s. He made quite an impression opposite Robert Donat and Marlene Dietrich in Knight Without Armour as Poushkoff, a sensitive, conflicted young commissar who saves their lives during the Russian Revolution. He came to further prominence when film director Victor Saville chose him to star opposite Ralph Richardson in South Riding (1938). The two actors were reunited in the very successful The Four Feathers (1939).

After that Clements's film career was somewhat intermittent, although he made a series of British war films for Ealing Studios and British Aviation Pictures, such as Convoy (1940), Ships with Wings (1942), Tomorrow We Live (1943) and as Yugoslav guerrilla leader Milosh Petrovitch in Undercover (1943). He had a cameo role (as Advocate General) in Gandhi (1982).

Honours and death
Clements was made a Commander of the Order of the British Empire (CBE) in 1956 and was knighted in 1968. He died in Brighton, East Sussex, in 1988.

Filmography

 The Divine Spark (1935) as Florino
 Once in a New Moon (1935) as Edward Teale
 Ticket of Leave (1936) as Lucky Fisher 
 Things to Come (1936) as The Airman (uncredited)
 Rembrandt (1936) as Govaert Flinck
 Knight Without Armour (1937) as Poushkoff
 I, Claudius (1937) as Valente
 South Riding (1938) as Joe Astell
 Housemaster (1938) as Undetermined Minor Role (uncredited)
 Star of the Circus (1938) as Paul Houston
 The Four Feathers (1939) as Harry Faversham
 Convoy (1940) as Lieutenant Cranford
 This England (1941) as John Rookeby
 Ships with Wings (1941) as Lieutenant Dick Stacey
 Tomorrow We Live (1943) as Jean Baptiste
 Undercover (1943) as Milosh Petrovitch
 They Came to a City (1944) as Joe Dinmore
 Call of the Blood (1949) as Julius Ikon
 Train of Events (1949) as Raymond Hillary (segment "The Composer")
 The Silent Enemy (1958) as The Admiral
 The Mind Benders (1963) as Major Hall
 Oh! What a Lovely War (1969) as General Helmut von Moltke
 Gandhi (1982) as Advocate General
 Top Secret! (1984) as East German Dignitary (uncredited) (final film role)

Selected theatre credits
 The Venetian (1931)
 Edward, My Son (1949)
 And This Was Odd (1951)

References

External links 
 
John Clements archive at the University of Bristol Theatre Collection, University of Bristol

Alumni of St John's College, Cambridge
Commanders of the Order of the British Empire
English male film actors
English male stage actors
English theatre managers and producers
Knights Bachelor
Actors awarded knighthoods
People from Hendon
People educated at St Paul's School, London
1910 births
1988 deaths
20th-century English male actors
Standing family
20th-century English businesspeople